Bagooo' may refer to:

 Bagoo (Empire of Dreams), a fictional character
 Bagoo, Zahedan, a village in Iran

See also 
 Bagu (disambiguation)